Fashafeesh is an Iraqi adult animated sitcom comedy adventure series created by Muhaned Abu Khumra  for Al Sharqiya TV channel. The series is a satirical depiction of working class life, epitomized by Al Attak family, which consists of Atooki, his mother khachia and his father Mzeiaal  and Bait Shnawa Family which consists of Shalash, his brother Dahash and their mother Tishara, and their friends Daabool, Alloy and sleet The show is set in One of Baghdad's poorest areas and parodies Iraqi culture and society. The series premiered on May 17, 2018 .The series has received local acclaim for its originality, creativity and humor.

Characters

Fashafeesh is a label that was launched on a group of friends who are divided into two families. They compete with each other and wrestle, but their conflicts are always ended in failure so that the parties and others see them unite to face the danger. They are stupid and intelligent at the same time. They are courageous and support the weak at all times. Atoki is trading in the old goods a young man who had previous relationships all failed, so he always drinks wine at night and sometimes smoke cannabis. Seleete is a friend of Otoki trading in birds has the talent of stupidity and always uses words are not in place and time is very brave and loves his friends so much. Alloly is A fat young man who loves to eat a lot and has a spirit of humor and also challenges his friends stupidly. Shalash, a young intellectual who reads many books, left his former fiancée because of family problems. Daboul, a friend of Shalash, is a stupid person and has a loyalty to his friend Shalash. Dahash is the elder brother of Shalash, who considers himself to be directly responsible for the family and his decisions are always wrong. A young widow with a history of secrets, craps and surprises that always surprise everyone in a dangerous mystery, she is considered one of the greatest witches of her time, but she has a good heart that loves good for all.

Production

Development
Director and writer ’Muhaned Abu Khumra decided to combine the two series with each other in a single series called Fashafeesh. And also drew the characters of the Show in a modern gives a sense of drawing as a three-dimensional, also used three-dimensional programs to build serial backgrounds to give a wonderful harmony and a comfortable sense to the viewer.

List of episodes

Season 1

External links 
 Fashafeesh YouTube channel

References
 Fashafeesh links 

Iraqi television series
2018 Iraqi television series debuts
Arabic-language television shows
2010s Iraqi television series